Yoshitaka "Yosi" Adachi (born 3 May 1962) is a Palauan politician. He was the Governor of Koror for 3 consecutive terms from 2006-2018 and stepped down due to the term limits imposed by the Koror State Constitution. He ran for Vice President of Palau in the 2016 Palauan general election but lost to Raynold Oilouch. He is seeking re-election for the office of Governor of Koror in the November 2021 election against incumbent Franco Gibbons and three other candidates.

References

Living people
1962 births
Governors of Koror
People from Koror